Weluwaddy (d. 1186) was a chief queen consort of King Sithu II of the Pagan Dynasty of Myanmar. According to the royal chronicles, Sithu II overthrew his brother King Naratheinkha after his brother seized his wife Weluwaddy in 1174.

Early life
According to the chronicles, the future queen was born inside the stalk of a glowing bamboo plant in the forest of Myinsaing. She was found by a commoner family, and grew up to be a great beauty. When King Naratheinkha came to power in 1171, the chief of Myinsaing sent her as part of his tribute to the new king. At the palace in Pagan (Bagan), the king was not impressed by the country girl before him. He is said to have particularly disliked her ears, deeming them too large. He passed, and gave her to his younger brother Crown Prince Narapati who made her a junior wife.

At Pagan
Chronicles say that the former country girl blossomed into a sophisticated beauty in the next few years. Her transformation was orchestrated by the dowager queen Myauk Pyinthe. The queen mother had the girl's ears surgically reduced, sent her to finishing school, and personally taught her court etiquette. The junior princess is said to have emerged more beautiful and sophisticated than all other princesses at the palace. She was finally noticed by the king himself one day when she accompanied the queen mother to a party at the palace. There, the king was taken by her beauty, and now coveted his brother's wife.

Naratheinkha's attempt to seize her in the next few months would alter the course of history. The king hastily came up with a scheme: He had a minister falsely report a rebellion in the extreme north of the kingdom at Ngasaunggyan (present-day Dehong, Yunnan), and ordered his brother, commander-in-chief of the royal army, to march there. As ordered, Narapati left with the army. When the army reached Thissein (modern Shwebo District), about 210 km north of Pagan, Naratheinkha raised his sister-in-law to queen. But the news reached Thissein within a few days as a cavalry officer loyal to the crown prince came up to deliver the news. Narapati turned around, and sent an elite company of 80 troops led by Commander Aung Zwa with the order to assassinate the king.

Queen of Pagan
In 1174, Narapati became king as Sithu II. All three main chronicles say that she became the chief queen consort with the title of Weluwaddy (Pali: Veluvati). However, a contemporary inscription from Sithu II's reign places her last in a list of six senior queens. The couple had a son, Zeya Thura. Both Weluwaddy and Zeya Thura were given the towns of Talok, Amyint and Aneint (modern Myingyan and Monywa Districts) in fief.

She died in 1186. After her death, the king dedicated the Shwe Thabeik Pagoda in Talok (Myingyan District).

Notes

References

Bibliography
 
 
 
 
 

Chief queens consort of Pagan
1186 deaths
1150s births
12th-century Burmese women